The Grace S. Webb School, part of the Institute of Living (a psychiatric hospital) in Hartford, Connecticut, provides special education, clinical and related services to students who are in grades K-12.

References

Schools in Hartford, Connecticut
Special schools in the United States